Richard E. Berry (born November 4, 1978) is a Canadian former ice hockey defenceman who played in the NHL with the Colorado Avalanche, Pittsburgh Penguins and the Washington Capitals. Berry now lives in Colorado and is a financial consultant.

Playing career
Berry was drafted 55th overall in the 1997 NHL Entry Draft by the Colorado Avalanche. He played the majority of his first three pro seasons in the American Hockey League with the Hershey Bears. In his first full season with Colorado, he played 57 games before he was traded to the Pittsburgh Penguins on March 19, 2002 with Ville Nieminen for Darius Kasparaitis. He did not last long in Pittsburgh, as he was claimed by the Washington Capitals in the Waiver Draft later that year.

In 2006, he signed with the New York Islanders as a free agent but never played for the team suiting up for the Islanders affiliate Bridgeport Sound Tigers. In the 2007–08 season unable to find a NHL club, Berry signed with the Springfield Falcons of the AHL.

In the 2008–09, his final season, Berry signed with German team, Füchse Duisburg of the Deutsche Eishockey Liga and scored 11 points in 47 games.

In 197 career NHL games, Berry scored 2 goals and 13 assists for 15 points, while accumulating 314 penalty minutes.

Career statistics

References

 2005 NHL Official Guide & Record Book

External links

1978 births
Bridgeport Sound Tigers players
Canadian ice hockey defencemen
Colorado Avalanche draft picks
Colorado Avalanche players
Füchse Duisburg players
Hershey Bears players
Living people
Ice hockey people from Manitoba
Milwaukee Admirals players
People from Parkland Region, Manitoba
Pittsburgh Penguins players
Portland Pirates players
San Antonio Rampage players
Seattle Thunderbirds players
Springfield Falcons players
Spokane Chiefs players
Utah Grizzlies (AHL) players
Washington Capitals players
Canadian expatriate ice hockey players in Germany